Cooke Plains is a settlement in South Australia. It is adjacent to the Dukes Highway on the Adelaide–Melbourne railway about halfway between Tailem Bend and Coomandook, however trains no longer stop there. The town has several businesses and a Soldier's Memorial Hall (emblazoned with the possessive "Cooke's Plains" in the stonework).

Cooke Plains township was originally a private subdivision, named after the pastoralists James and Archie Cooke.
Cooke Plains boundaries now also include the former government town of Bedford which was surveyed in August 1871 and declared ceased to exist on 28 April 1960.

References

Towns in South Australia